The Lycian spring minnow (Pseudophoxinus evliyae) is a species of ray-finned fish in the family Cyprinidae.
It is found in drainages in western Anatoliain Turkey.

References

Pseudophoxinus
Endemic fauna of Turkey
Cyprinid fish of Asia
Fish described in 2010